Papelekis is a village in the Švenčionys District Municipality. The village is located near the border with Belarus, and the external European Union border post stands to the east.

References 

Vilnius Voivodeship
Švenčionys District Municipality
Villages in Vilnius County